The Izmailovo Sports Palace is an indoor arena located in the Eastern Planning Zone in Moscow, Russia. It hosted the weightlifting competitions for the 1980 Summer Olympics.

References
1980 Summer Olympics official report. Volume 2. Part 1. pp. 112–4.

Venues of the 1980 Summer Olympics
Indoor arenas in Russia
Olympic weightlifting venues
Sports venues built in the Soviet Union
Sports venues in Russia